Hae-Young Kee is a professor in the department of physics at the University of Toronto and is a Canada Research Chair in the Theory of Quantum Materials. In 2018, she was elected as a Fellow of the American Physical Society and in 2020 was made a Theoretical Physics Distinguished Fellow from Asia Pacific Center.

References

External links 

Year of birth missing (living people)
Living people
Canadian physicists
Canadian women physicists
Academic staff of the University of Toronto
Fellows of the American Physical Society